Mendele Mocher Sforim (also known as Moykher, Sfarim; lit. "Mendele the book peddler"; January 2, 1836, Kapyl – December 8, 1917 [N.S.], Odessa), born Sholem Yankev Abramovich or S. J. Abramowitch, was a Jewish author and one of the founders of modern Yiddish and Hebrew literature.

Youth
Mendele was born to a poor Lithuanian Jewish family in Kapyl in Minsk Governorate. His father, Chaim Moyshe Broyde, died shortly after Mendele's bar mitzvah. He studied in yeshiva in Slutsk and Vilna until he was 17; during this time he was a day-boarder under the system of Teg-essen, barely scraping by, and often hungry.

Mendele traveled extensively around Belarus, Ukraine and Lithuania at the mercy of an abusive beggar named Avreml Khromoy (Russian for "Avreml the Lame"); Avreml would later become the source for the title character of Fishke der Krumer (Fishke the Lame). In 1854, Mendele settled in Kamianets-Podilskyi, where he got to know writer and poet Avrom Ber Gotlober, who helped him to understand secular culture, philosophy, literature, history, Russian and other languages.

Early work
Mendele's first article, "Letter on Education", appeared in 1857, in the first Hebrew newspaper, Hamagid; his mentor Gotlober submitted Mendele's school paper without Mendele's prior knowledge. In Berdichev, where he lived from 1858 to 1869, he began to publish fiction both in Hebrew and Yiddish. Having offended the local powers with his satire, he left Berdichev to train as a rabbi at the relatively theologically liberal, government-sponsored rabbinical school in Zhitomir, where he lived from 1869 to 1881, and became the head of the traditional school (Talmud Torah) in Odessa in 1881. He lived in Odessa until his death in 1917, except for two years spent in Geneva, where he fled the government-inspired pogroms following the failed revolution of 1905.

Grandfather of Yiddish literature
Mendele initially wrote in Hebrew, coining many words in that language, but ultimately switched to Yiddish in order to expand his audience. Like Sholem Aleichem, he used a pseudonym because of the perception at the time that as a ghetto vernacular, Yiddish was not suited to serious literary work — an idea he did much to dispel. His writing strongly bore the mark of the Haskalah. He is considered by many to be the "grandfather of Yiddish literature", an epithet first accorded to him by Sholem Aleichem, in the dedication to his novel Stempenyu: A Jewish Novel. Mendele's style in both Hebrew and Yiddish has strongly influenced several generations of later writers.

While the tradition of journalism in Yiddish had a bit more of a history than in Hebrew, Kol Mevasser, which he supported from the outset and where he published his first Yiddish story, in 1863, is generally seen as the first stable and important Yiddish newspaper.

Ideology and later work

Sol Liptzin writes that in his early Yiddish narratives, Mendele "wanted to be useful to his people rather than gain literary laurels". Two of his early works, the story  and the unstaged 1869 drama  (The Tax), condemned the corruption by which religious taxes (in the latter case, specifically the tax on kosher meat) were diverted to benefit community leaders rather than the poor.

(The title is a reference to the well-known travel book of the Medieval Spanish-Jewish traveller Benjamin of Tudela.)

As with Fishke, Mendele worked on and off for decades on his long novel   (The Wishing Ring, 1865–1889), with at least two versions preceding the final one. It is the story of a maskil — that is, a supporter of the Haskalah, like Mendele himself — who escapes a poor town, survives misery to obtain a secular education much like Mendele's own, but is driven by the pogroms of the 1880s from his dreams of universal brotherhood to one of Jewish nationalism.  The first English translation, by Michael Wex (author of Born to Kvetch), was published in 2003.

References

Further reading
Liptzin, Sol, A History of Yiddish Literature, Jonathan David Publishers, Middle Village, NY, 1972, especially 40-45.
YIVO Encyclopedia of Jews of Eastern Europe

External links

 
 
 Mendele, a mainly English-language newsletter about Yiddish language and culture, is named after Mendele Mocher Sforim.
 Mendele Moykher-Sforim at Maison de la culture Yiddish-Bibliothèque Medem.
 Literature by and about Mendele Mocher Sforim in University Library JCS Frankfurt am Main: Digital Collections Judaica

1836 births
1917 deaths
People from Kapyl
People from Slutsky Uyezd
Belarusian Jews
Hebrew-language writers
Yiddish-language literature
Yiddish-language satirists
People of the Haskalah